Potamanaxas is a genus of skipper butterflies in the family Hesperiidae.

Species
Potamanaxas andraemon (Mabille, 1898)
Potamanaxas bana Bell, 1956
Potamanaxas effusa (Draudt, 1922)
Potamanaxas flavofasciata (Hewitson, 1870)
Potamanaxas frenda Evans, 1953
Potamanaxas hirta (Weeks, 1901)
Potamanaxas laoma (Hewitson, 1870)
Potamanaxas latrea (Hewitson, 1875)
Potamanaxas melicertes (Godman & Salvin, [1895])
Potamanaxas paralus (Godman & Salvin, [1895])
Potamanaxas quira Bell, 1956
Potamanaxas thestia (Hewitson, 1870)
Potamanaxas thoria (Hewitson, 1870)
Potamanaxas tunga Bell, 1956
Potamanaxas unifasciata (C. & R. Felder, 1867)
Potamanaxas xantholeuce (Mabille, 1888)

References

 , 1956: Descriptions of some new species of neotropical Hesperiidae (Lepidoptera, Rhopalocera). American Museum Novitates 1778: 1-13. Full article: .

External links
Natural History Museum Lepidoptera genus database

Erynnini
Hesperiidae genera